Novoalexeyevka is a rural locality (a village) in Miyakibashevsky Selsoviet, Miyakinsky District, Bashkortostan, Russia. The population was 8 as of 2010. There is 1 street.

Geography 
Novoalexeyevka is located 17 km northeast of Kirgiz-Miyaki (the district's administrative centre) by road. Dneprovka is the nearest rural locality.

References 

Rural localities in Miyakinsky District